Baba Mahmud-e Vosta (also Romanized as Bābā Maḩmūd-e Vosţá) is a village in Dehpir Rural District, in the Central District of Khorramabad County, Lorestan Province, Iran. At the 2006 census, its population was 141, in 38 families.

References 

Towns and villages in Khorramabad County